Eric Walter Handley,  (12 November 1926 – 17 January 2013) was a British classical scholar, noted for his work on the Greek new comic poet Menander. He was Director of the Institute of Classical Studies, University of London from 1967 to 1984, Professor of Greek at University College London from 1968 to 1984, and Regius Professor of Greek at the University of Cambridge from 1984 to 1994. Handley supported the JACT Greek summer school at Bryanston in Dorset, acting as a tutor on a number of occasions, and lecturing on Menander.

Early life
Handley was born on 12 November 1926. He grew up in Birmingham. He was educated at King Edward's School, Birmingham, having won a scholarship to the private boys school, and then at Trinity College, Cambridge, where he matriculated at the age of sixteen.

Personal life 
Handley married Carol Taylor on 31 July 1952. She was headmistress of Camden School for Girls (1971–85) and President of the Classical Association (1996–7).

Honours
In the 1983 New Year Honours, Handley was appointed a Commander of the Order of the British Empire (CBE) in recognition of his work as Professor of Greek at University College, London. He was a fellow of the Norwegian Academy of Science and Letters from 1996.

References

 

 
 
 

1926 births
2013 deaths
British classical scholars
Commanders of the Order of the British Empire
Academics of the University of London
People educated at King Edward's School, Birmingham
Members of the University of Cambridge faculty of classics
Classical scholars of the University of London
Alumni of Trinity College, Cambridge
Members of the Norwegian Academy of Science and Letters
Regius Professors of Greek (Cambridge)
Presidents of the Classical Association